Burning the Day is the seventh studio album by the Randy Rogers Band, an American country music group. It was released on August 24, 2010, via MCA Nashville. Its first single, "Too Late for Goodbye," peaked at number 47 on the Billboard Hot Country Songs chart.

Track listing

Personnel
Compiled from liner notes.

Randy Rogers Band
 Brady Black — fiddle, background vocals
 Geoffrey Hill — electric guitar, background vocals
 Les Lawless — drums
 Jon Richardson — bass guitar
 Randy Rogers — lead vocals, acoustic guitar

Additional musicians
 Eric Borash — electric guitar
 Bruce Bouton — steel guitar
 Shelly Fairchild — background vocals
 Brian Keane — background vocals
 Tim Lauer — piano, Hammond B-3 organ, Wurlitzer electric piano, clavinet
 Shannon Lawson — background vocals
 Paul Worley — acoustic guitar

Chart performance

References

2010 albums
Randy Rogers Band albums
MCA Records albums
Albums produced by Paul Worley